Thornton Stringfellow (March 6, 1788 – March 6, 1869) was the pastor of Stevensburg Baptist Church in Culpeper County, Virginia. He is perhaps best known for using Christianity to advocate for African-American slavery.

A native of Fauquier County, Stringfellow was ordained in 1814 and ministered in Fauquier and Culpeper Counties for the duration of his career. Besides slavery, he was an advocate for temperance, domestic missions, and Sunday Schools. He was a slaveholder himself. Stringfellow is buried in the Stevensburg churchyard.

References

Bibliography
 A Brief Examination of Scripture Testimony on the Institution of Slavery, 1850
 Scriptural and Statistical Views in Favor of Slavery, 1856
 Slavery: Its Origin, Nature, and History, 1861

External links
Online works

1788 births
1869 deaths
19th-century Baptist ministers from the United States
19th-century American male writers
American proslavery activists
People from Culpeper County, Virginia
Place of birth missing
Place of death missing
Baptists from Virginia
19th-century American non-fiction writers
American male non-fiction writers
Writers from Virginia
People from Fauquier County, Virginia
Religious leaders from Virginia
Activists from Virginia